Sassendalen is a valley at Spitsbergen, Svalbard. The valley is among the largest valleys of Svalbard, and continues westwards into Sassenfjorden. Part of the valley divides Sabine Land and Nordenskiöld Land . The river Sassenelva runs through the valley.

References

Valleys of Spitsbergen